The Essen Mosquitoes are a professional ice hockey team from Essen, Germany that competed in the Deutsche Eishockey Liga (DEL) from 1999–2000 until the 2001–02 when they lost their license due to insolvency. After this the team played in the 2.Bundesliga, and now play in the Oberliga Nord.

Deutsche Eishockey Liga teams
Ice hockey teams in Germany